The Romanian Front electoral district was a constituency created for the 1917 Russian Constituent Assembly election. The electoral district covered the Romanian Front of the Russian Army. Moreover, the constituency covered the Danube Flotilla.

Unlike the Western Front, the Romanian Front was remote from events in the mother country and relatively untouched by Bolshevik agitation for immediate peace. As of the spring of 1917, the soldiers' organizations of the Romanian Front were dominated by officers, who repressed revolutionary soldier organizers.

According to U.S. historian Oliver Henry Radkey some 12,000-15,000 votes appeared to be missing from official records.

Results

References

Electoral districts of the Russian Constituent Assembly election, 1917
1910s elections in Ukraine